One of the apocryphal books, the Psalms of Solomon is a group of eighteen psalms (religious songs or poems) written in the first or second centuries BC that are not part of any current scriptural canon (they are, however, found in copies of the Peshitta and the Septuagint).

Name 
The 17th of the 18 psalms is similar to Psalm 72 which has traditionally been attributed to Solomon, and hence may be the reason that the Psalms of Solomon have their name. An alternate theory is that the psalms were so highly regarded that Solomon's name was attached to them to keep them from being ignored or forgotten.

Reception history 
The Psalms of Solomon were referred to in early Christian writings, but lost to later generations until a Greek manuscript was rediscovered in the 17th century. There are currently eleven known 11th- to 16th-century manuscripts of a Greek translation from a lost Hebrew or Aramaic original, probably dating from the 1st or 2nd century BC. However, though now a collection, they were originally separate, written by different people in different periods.

There exist also four Syriac manuscripts. The earliest historical evidence of "Eighteen Psalms of Solomon" is in the list at the beginning of the Codex Alexandrinus (fifth century). According to James H. Charlesworth, "it has been calculated that the Psalms of Solomon would have fit into the twelve missing pages of the Codex Sinaiticus.

Content and authorship 
Politically, the Psalms of Solomon are anti-Hasmonean, and some psalms in the collection show a clear awareness of the Roman conquest of Jerusalem under Pompey in 63 BC, metaphorically treating him as a dragon who had been sent by God to punish the Hasmoneans.  Some of the psalms are messianic, in the Jewish sense (clearly referring to a mortal that happens to be divinely assisted, much like Moses), but the majority are concerned less with the world at large, and more with individual behavior, expressing a belief that repentance for unintended sins will return them to God's favor.

There have been attempts to link the text both to the Essenes of Qumran, who separated themselves from what they saw as a wicked world, and alternatively to the Pharisees in opposition to the Sadducees who generally supported the Maccabees.

See also
List of Old Testament pseudepigrapha
Odes of Solomon

References

External links

Psalms of Solomon: text and discussion
English translation by G. Buchanan Gray (1913): at Wesley Center
English translation by Kenneth Atkinson (2009), from the New English Translation of the Septuagint — Psalms of Salomon
Septuagint Psalms of Solomon in Greek
An Introduction to the Old Testament in Greek, Henry Barclay Swete, Cambridge University Press, 1914, page 282
Psalms of Solomon entry in historical sourcebook by Mahlon H. Smith

2nd-century BC books
1st-century BC books
Old Testament pseudepigrapha
Solomon
Psalms
Jewish texts
Jewish apocrypha